The women's long jump event at the 2008 World Junior Championships in Athletics was held in Bydgoszcz, Poland, at Zawisza Stadium on 11 and 12 July.

Medalists

Results

Final
12 July

Qualifications
11 July

Group A

Group B

Participation
According to an unofficial count, 24 athletes from 20 countries participated in the event.

References

Long jump
Long jump at the World Athletics U20 Championships
2008 in women's athletics